The 1966–67 Copa del Generalísimo was the 65th staging of the Spanish Cup. The competition began on 23 October 1966 and ended on 2 July 1967 with the final.

First round

|}
Tiebreaker

|}

Round of 32

|}
Tiebreaker

|}

Round of 16

|}
Tiebreaker

|}

Quarter-finals

|}
Tiebreaker

|}

Semi-finals

|}

Final

|}

External links
 rsssf.com
 linguasport.com

Copa del Rey seasons
Copa del Rey
Copa